Nymphaea odorata, also known as the American white waterlily, fragrant water-lily, beaver root, fragrant white water lily, white water lily, sweet-scented white water lily, and sweet-scented water lily, is an aquatic plant belonging to the genus Nymphaea. It can commonly be found in shallow lakes, ponds, and permanent slow moving waters throughout North America where it ranges from Central America to northern Canada. It is also reported from Brazil and Guyana.

Description
This plant is rooted from a branched rhizomes which gives rise to long petioles which terminate in smooth floating leaves. Since the leaves are subject to tearing by water and waves, they are round with a waxy upper coating that is water-repellent. The flowers also float. They are radially symmetric with prominent yellow stamens and many white petals. The flowers open each day and close again each night and are very fragrant. Once the flowers are pollinated, the developing fruit is pulled back under water for maturation.

Plant systematists often use it as a typical member of Nymphaeaceae, which (other than Amborella) is the most basal of the flowering plants.

It is cultivated in aquatic gardens as an ornamental plant.

Chemistry 
The lignans nymphaeoside A and icariside E, and the flavonols kaempferol 3-O-alpha-l-rhamnopyranoside (afzelin), quercetin 3-O-alpha-l-rhamnopyranoside (quercitrin), myricetin 3-O-alpha-l-rhamnopyranoside (myricitrin), quercetin 3-O-(6'-O-acetyl)-beta-d-galactopyranoside, myricetin 3-O-beta-d-galactopyranoside and myricetin 3-O-(6'-O-acetyl)-beta-d-galactopyranoside can be found in N. odorata.

Subspecies 
 Nymphaea odorata subsp. odorata
 Nymphaea odorata subsp. tuberosa

Uses
The fragrant water-lily has both medicinal and edible parts. The seeds, flowers and rhizomes can all be eaten raw or cooked. The root can be boiled to produce a liquid which can be gargled to treat sore throats or drunk to treat diarrhea. The rhizomes were also used by Native Americans to treat coughs and colds. The stem can be placed directly on teeth to treat a toothache.

The muck-submerged stems are eaten by muskrats.

References

External links
Jepson Manual Treatment

odorata
Flora of North America
Flora of South America
Freshwater plants